Lanham may refer to:

Places
In the United States:
Lanham, Kansas and Nebraska
Lanham, Maryland
Lanham-Seabrook, Maryland, former census-designated place

Other uses
Lanham (surname)
Lanham Act